The Illinois Army National Guard is a component of the United States Army and the United States National Guard.  With the Illinois Air National Guard it forms the Illinois National Guard. National coordination of various state National Guard units are maintained through the National Guard Bureau. The Illinois Army National Guard is composed of approximately 10,000 soldiers.

Illinois Army National Guard units are trained and equipped as part of the United States Army. The same ranks and insignia are used (see United States Army enlisted rank insignia and United States Army officer rank insignia). National Guardsmen are eligible to receive all United States military awards. The Illinois Guard also bestows a number of state awards for local services rendered in or to the state of Illinois.

History
The Illinois Army National Guard was originally formed in 1712 as a colonial French militia.  The militia worked under British sovereignty in the mid-eighteenth century, until the American Revolutionary War, when in 1779 Colonel George Rogers Clark, with 200 frontiersmen, of the Illinois Regiment, Virginia State Forces, from Kaskaskia, captured Fort Sackville from British Colonel Henry Hamilton and his military forces.  A small force of Illinois militia later, captured Prairie du Chien. Following the American Civil War, the state forces were reorganized under the command of Arthur C. Ducat, who became the first major general of the statewide Illinois militia.

The Militia Act of 1903 organized the various state militias into the present National Guard system. The 44th Infantry Division was part of the IL ARNG from 1945/46. It was inducted into Federal Service during the Korean War but on its release the Governor of Illinois declined to support it, citing budgetary considerations. It was thus deactivated on its release from Federal Service in December 1954. From that time, Illinois ARNG units have formed part of the 33rd, and then the 47th until November 1991. In November 1991 the 66th Infantry Brigade was reassigned to the 34th Infantry Division. Later it was reassigned again to the 35th Infantry Division.

For much of the final decades of the twentieth century, National Guard personnel typically served "One weekend a month, two weeks a year", with a portion working for the Guard in a full-time capacity.  Around 2006, the forces formation plans of the US Army call for the typical National Guard unit (or National Guardsman) to serve one year of active duty for every three years of service.  More specifically, United States Department of Defense policy was that no Guardsman will be involuntarily activated for a total of more than 24 months (cumulative) in one six-year enlistment period. This policy was due to change on August 1, 2007, with the new policy states that soldiers will be given 24 months between deployments of no more than 24 months. However, individual states have differing policies.

The 33rd Inf Bde Combat Team served in Afghanistan in 2008–09.
Activated: August 21, 2008 (National Guard brigade from Illinois).
Overseas: September 2008.
Campaigns: Afghanistan (OEF)
Presidential Unit Citation: 1.
Returned Home August 21, 2009

Historic units
Regiments that have served with the IL ARNG since 1917 include:

Units
33rd Infantry Brigade Combat Team (33rd IBCT)
 2nd Battalion, 130th Infantry Regiment
 1st Battalion, 178th Infantry Regiment
 2nd Squadron, 106th Cavalry Regiment–Reconnaissance, Surveillance, and Target Acquisition (RSTA)
 2nd Battalion, 122nd Field Artillery Regiment (1-122nd FAR)
 766th Brigade Engineer Battalion (766th BEB)
 634th Brigade Support Battalion (634th BSB)

108th Sustainment Brigade
 Special Troops Battalion (STB)
 108th Multifunctional Medical Battalion (108th MMB)
 198th Combat Service Support Battalion (198th CSSB)
 232nd Combat Service Support Battalion (232nd CSSB)

404th Maneuver Enhancement Brigade (404th MEB)
 33rd Military Police Battalion (33rd MPB)
 44th Chemical Battalion
 123rd Engineer Battalion
 44th Rear Operations Center (44th ROC) (ASG)

65th Troop Command
 1st Battalion, 106th Aviation Regiment
 2nd Battalion, 123rd Field Artillery Regiment (2-123rd FAR)
 139th Mobile Public Affairs Detachment (139th MPAD)
 144th Army Band
 5th Civil Support Team (5th CST)
 244th Digital Liaison Detachment (244th DLD)

See also
Illinois Reserve Militia

References

External links
Bibliography of Illinois Army National Guard History compiled by the United States Army Center of Military History
Illinois Army National Guard, accessed November 20, 2006
GlobalSecurity.org Illinois Army National Guard, accessed November 20, 2006

United States Army National Guard by state
Military in Illinois